AKTV (pronounced "active", officially branded as AKTV on IBC) was the primetime sports programming block in the Philippines. Owned and operated by TV5, it occupied the 5:00 to 11:00pm timeslot of IBC; weekend coverage usually began at 11:00 am to 11:00 pm. It started on June 5, 2011, and it ended in May 2013 due to high airtime costs and low ratings.

History
IBC signed a blocktime agreement with TV5's sports division Sports5 to air live sports coverage via its new programming block AKTV. It was launched on June 5, 2011, with the AKTV Run held outside SM Mall of Asia in Bay City, Pasay.

Cancellation
However, on April 11, 2013, TV5 announced that the blocktime agreement with IBC would not be renewed, meaning AKTV would cease broadcasting in May 2013. The move was due to high cost and low ratings given by IBC to air over the channel. Broadcasts of the NCAA basketball tournament, and the United Football League were moved to AksyonTV/5 Plus, although Sports5 (now One Sports)-produced PBA games continue to air in the channel until October. IBC, later signed another blocktime agreement with Asian Television Content Corporation, to air a new set of primetime programs under ATC@IBC, which is set to aired on June 2, 2014. Until August 31, 2014, the ATC@IBC primetime block was cancelled due to poor ratings and loss of advertisers' support. It is later noted that, despite the expiration of blocktime agreement, TV5 continues to use IBC-13's Broadcast City facilities for sports events including its 2014 FIBA Basketball World Cup coverage; as MediaQuest Holdings is a possible bidder for the privatization of IBC-13. However, MediaQuest could not join the privatization bid due to ownership rules and regulations that MediaQuest owns TV5 and AksyonTV.

Programming

Final Sports specials/coverage
AIBA European Continental Championships
AIBA Junior World Championships 
Australian Open (2012, 2013)
ATP World Master Tours 
BWF Grand Prix 
F1 Grand Prix 
Wimbledon Championship 
World 10-Ball Championship 
World Sumo Challenge
Smart Ultimate All-Star Weekend (July 2011)
2011 William Jones Cup
Bundesliga
Barclays Premier League
2011 PBA Draft
FIBA Americas Championship 2011
2011 Eurobasket FIBA Europe Championship
PartyPoker.com World Cup of Pool
FIBA Asia Champions Cup 2011
2011 FIBA Asia Championship
2011 LBC Ronda Pilipinas
2011 Southeast Asian Games
La Liga
2012 London Olympics
2012 William Jones Cup
PBA Dream Game 2012 (February 2012)
Aliwan Fiesta 2012
RHB Singapore Cup
UEFA Euro 2012
4th FIBA Asia Cup
2012 DFL-Supercup
2012 AFF Suzuki Cup (November–December 2012)

Former
PBA on AKTV (2011–2013)
Shakey's V-League (2012–2013)
LBC United Football League (2011–2013) 
Pacific Xtreme Combat (2011–2013)
PBA D-League (2011–2013)
NCAA on AKTV (2012–2013)
The Main Event (produced by Viva Sports) (2008–2013)
Bigtime Bakbakan (2011–2013)
Fight Quest (2011–2013) 
Fight Sports Knockouts (2011–2013)
Fight Sports Greatest Classics (2011–2013)
Fight Sports World Championship Kick Boxing (2011–2013)
Fight Sports BWF (2011–2013)
Knockout Sportsworld (2011–2013)
Fight Sports Wide World of Fights (2011–2013)
Whacked Out Sports (2012–2013)
WWE Bottom Line (2012–2013)
WWE SmackDown (2012–2013)

References

External links 

TV5 Network
 
Television programming blocks in Asia
Sports television in the Philippines